Kanjikuzhi is a village in Idukki district of Kerala, Indian.

Kanjikuzhi, or similar, may also refer to the following places in the Indian state of Kerala:

 Kanjikkuzhi, a census town in Kottayam district
 Kanjikuzhi (Alappuzha), a census town and Panchayat in Alappuzha district
 Kanjikuzhy, a village in Idukki, Kottayam, Alapuzha district